The men's snowboard team cross competition of the FIS Freestyle Ski and Snowboarding World Championships 2017 was held at Sierra Nevada, Spain on March 13. 
30 athletes from 11 countries competed.

Elimination round
The following are the results of the elimination round.

Quarterfinals

Heat 1

Heat 2

Heat 3

Heat 4

Semifinals

Heat 1

Heat 2

Finals

Small Finals

Big Finals

References

Snowboard team cross, men's